André Darrigade (born 24 April 1929 in Narrosse) is a retired French professional road bicycle racer between 1951 and 1966. Darrigade, a road sprinter won the 1959 World Championship and 22 stages of the Tour de France. Five of those Tour victories were on opening days, a record tied by Fabian Cancellara in 2012 (who won 4 prologues and an individual time trial in 2009).

Early life and amateur career
André Darrigade was born at Narosse, near Dax in the forested Landes region. He came to attention at the other end of the country and on the track by beating the future world sprint champion, Antonio Maspes in a meeting at the Vélodrome d'Hiver the night before the Six Days of Paris race there.

His name immediately appealed to northern crowds. René de Latour said: "It is a very 'musical' name to [northern] French ears, especially when pronounced by a southerner who rolls his Rs like a Scotsman to make it sound like Darrrrrigade. De Latour said:

André Darrigade is heavily built and would have made a good football centre forward. He has blond hair, clear eyes, rosy cheeks, and is a bit on the shy side. When we first saw him in Paris soon after the war finished he was a novice, not a roadman at all. He had come to the big city to ride in the final of the famous Médaille race at the Vélodrome d'Hiver. When he arrived at the Vélodrome d'Hiver, he had no soigneur, no dressing gown, nobody to hold him up at the start, pump his tyres or adjust his position to suit the high, frightening bankings. He was lonely — but courageous. And guess who was his principal victim — Antonio Maspes!

Darrigade stayed in Paris and joined one of its leading clubs, the Vélo-Club d'Asnières-Courbevoie, at the invitation of Francis Pélissier, the former professional who was one of its officials. Darrigade rode again on the track at the Vél' d'Hiv, winning madisons and sprints, and won four races on the road. He turned professional in 1951 for a salary that barely covered his rent.

Professional career

Raphaël Géminiani said: "Darrigade was the greatest French sprinter of all time and he'll stay that way for a long time. The mould has been broken. But he wasn't just a sprinter. He was an animateur who could start decisive breaks; he destroyed the image of sprinters who just sit on wheels." He began his sprints from a long distance from the line, challenging others to pass him. It endeared him to the French public, said de Latour.

Darrigade wore 19 yellow jerseys and won 22 stages. He won the opening stage of the Tour de France in 1956, 1957, 1958, 1959 and 1961. Darrigade lost time in the mountains and his best final positions were 16th in 1956, 1959 and 1960.

In single-day races, he won the national championship in 1955 on the famous Boucles de l'Aulne in Châteaulin, beating a Louison Bobet at the top of his career (reigning world champion and winner of the Tour de France 1953, 1954 and 1955).
He won the 1956 Giro di Lombardia, beating the Campionissimo Fausto Coppi in front of his home crowd at the Milan velodrome. A fortnight later he beat Coppi again to win the Trofeo Baracchi with Rolf Graf.
He won the world championship in Zandvoort on 16 August 1959, dominating a breakaway of eight riders, ahead of the Italian Michele Gismondi and the Belgian Noël Foré.

Darrigade was at his best in the middle of the season and the spring races were too early and those in autumn too late. He did, however, come fourth in the 1957 Paris–Roubaix, third in the 1958 Milan–San Remo and second in Paris–Brussels in 1960.

He said: "I was always considered a team man. I never had any pretensions to be anything else. In the days when the Tour had national teams, Marcel Bidot [the manager] always saw me as just that. Those wins never became dull or routine. Each one was an immense pleasure. What's more, I had the chance to race alongside such great champions as Louison Bobet and Jacques Anquetil." He was close to Anquetil, whom he called "bizarrely calm." He said: "Quite often, I had to say to him, 'If you don't get going, you'll lose the Tour."

On 19 July 1958 the Tour finished at the Parc des Princes in western Paris. The 70-year-old sécrétaire-général of the stadium, Constant Wouters ran across the grass in the centre of the ground to prevent photographers encroaching on the track. The journalists hid the riders and Wouters from each other and Darrigade rode into Wouters as he stepped onto the track. Darrigade was lifted from his bike and turned round and Wouters thrown into the air. Both fell heavily and were taken to hospital. Wouters was treated at the nearby Boucicaut medical centre but died on 31 July. Darrigade cracked his skull and broke ribs. He was able to return before the end of the meeting to take a lap of honour.

Honours and personal life
When Darrigade retired from cycle racing he ran a newspaper shop in Biarritz. On retiring for good, André became an ardent fan of Biarritz Olympique, the town's rugby team, with his friend Albaladejo. A stadium (Stade Omnisports André Darrigade) in Dax is named after Darrigade .

On 12 July 2017, a 6 metre tall statue, designed by "Meilleur Ouvrier de France" Guy Pendanx, was unveiled in Darrigade's honour in Narrosse .Darrigade's brother, Roger, six years younger, also rode as a professional. In 1955, both brothers were French national champions, André as a professional and Roger as an amateur. André Darrigade has two sons and two grandson and is an officer of the Légion d'honneur.

Career achievements

Major results

1949
 Winner of La Médaille
 Champion of Paris of Military Speed
 1st Grand Prix d'automne de vitesse
 2nd French Military Championship

1950
 1st Grand Prix de Boulogne
 1st Grand Prix de Paris-Beauvais
 1st Prix des oeuvres sociales à Daumesnil
 1st Critérium des vainqueurs
 3rd Paris-Dolhain

1951
 Bordeaux-Saintes
 1st Grand Prix des Alliés in Joinville
 1st Grand Prix d'Uza
 1st Grand Prix d'Eckbolsheim
 1st Grand Prix de Castelnau-Magnoac
 1st Grand Prix de Mirande-Astarac
 1st Grand Prix d'Albret
 2nd Grand Prix du Courrier picard
 2nd Grand Prix de l'Écho d'Alger

1952
 1st stage Paris-Saint Etienne
 1st stage Paris-Côte d'Azur
 10th stage Tour d'Algérie
 1st Grand Prix du Mans
 1st Grand Prix du Boucau
 1st Grand Prix d'Issoire
 1st Circuit des 2 Ponts
 3rd Critérium des As
 6th Paris–Tours

1953
 Tour de France
 1st stage 12
 6th stage du Tour du Sud-Est
 1st Prix d'Arras
 1st La Rochelle-Angoulême
 1st Circuit de la Chalosse
 2nd Paris–Bourges

1954
 1st Overall Tour de Picardie
 1st stage 2
 1st Grand Prix du Pneumatique
 1st Grand Prix de la Marseillaise
 1st Grand Prix du Tour
 1st Critérium de Bordeaux
 1st Critérium de Montlhéry
 3rd Roue d'Or à Daumesnil

1955
 1st  Road race, National Road Championships
 Tour de France
 1st stage 6
 1st Grand Prix de l'Écho d'Alger
 3rd stage Trois jours d'Anvers
 1st Critérium de Bordeaux
 1st Critérium de Montlhéry
 1st Critérium de Napoli
 1st Grand Prix de Mont-de-Marsan
 1st Grand Prix de Charlieu
 1st Grand Prix d'Issoire
 2nd Second Time Trial Team Barcelona Mediterranean Games
 2nd Trofeo Baracchi (with Jacques Anquetil)

1956
 Tour de France
 1st stage 1
  Combativity award Overall
 Held maillot jaune  during 6 stages
 1st Giro di Lombardia
 1st Trofeo Baracchi (with Rolf Graf)
 1st Critérium d'Amiens
 1st Critérium de Beverloo
 1st Grand Prix de Brigueil-le-Chantre
 1st Grand Prix de Moulins-Engelbert
 2nd Paris-Limoges
 2nd Roue d'Or à Daumesnil (with Jacques Anquetil)
 2nd du Grand Prix de l'Écho d'Alger
 3rd Circuit de l'Aulne

1957
 3rd  World Road Race Championships
 Tour de France
 1st stages 1, 3a, 21 & 22
 Held maillot jaune  during 1 stage
 1st stage 3 a Tour de Romandie
 1st Six Days of Paris (with Jacques Anquetil and Ferdinando Terruzzi)
 1st Roue d'Or à Daumesnil (with Jacques Anquetil)
 1st Grand Prix d'Europe (team time trial)
 1st Grand Prix d'Orchies
 1st Grand Prix de Ravennes
 1st Grand Prix de Vergt
 1st Grand Prix de Sant-Denis
 1st Grand Prix de Chalon-sur-Saône
 1st Grand Prix de Scaer
 2nd Critérium des As
 2nd Grand Prix d'Issoire
 4th Paris–Roubaix
 6th Giro di Lombardia
 7th Bordeaux–Paris
 8th Tour de Romandie
 9th Milan San–Remo

1958
 3rd  World Road Race Championships
 Tour de France
 1st stages 1, 9, 15, 17 & 22
 Held maillot jaune  during 5 stages
 1st Six Days of Paris (with Jacques Anquetil and Ferdinando Terruzzi)
 1st Paris-Valenciennes
 1st Roue d'Or à Daumesnil (with Jacques Anquetil)
 1st stage 2 GP Marvan (team time trial)
 1st stage 1 Four Days of Dunkirk
 1st Critérium d'Alger
 1st Critérium des Essarts
 1st Critérium de Londerzeel
 1st Critérium de Guecho
 1st Grand Prix de Boulogne
 1st Grand Prix de Montceau-les-Mines
 1st Grand Prix de Guerêt
 1st Grand Prix de Rouen
 2nd Trofeo Baracchi (with Jacques Anquetil)
 2nd Critérium des As
 3rd Milan–San Remo
 3rd Four Days of Dunkirk
 6th Paris–Tours

1959
 1st  World Road Race Championships
 Tour de France
 1st  Points classification
 1st stages 1 & 11
 Held maillot jaune  during 2 stages
 1st Critérium International
 1st Trophée Longines (team time trial, with Jacques Anquetil, Seamus Elliott, Jean Graczyk and Michel Vermeulin)
 1st Critérium de Barcelone
 1st Critérium de Dublin
 1st Grand Prix de Veyrac
 1st Roue d'Or à Daumesnil (with Roger Rivière, Louison Bobet and Roger Hassenforder)
 2nd Six Days of Ghent (with Gerrit Schulte)
 3rd Trophée Baracchi (with Jacques Anquetil)
 3rd Prestige Pernod
 6th Giro di Lombardia
 9th Super Prestige Pernod

1960
 2nd  World Road Race Championships
 3rd  French National Road Race Championships
 Tour de France
 1st stage 5
 1st stage 15 Giro d'Italia
 1st stage 6 a Paris–Nice
 1st stages 2 & 4 a Tour de Romandie
 1st Manx Trophy
 1st stage 5 Gênes-Rome
 1st Critérium d'Arras
 1st Grand Prix de Quillan
 2nd Critérium des As
 2nd Brussels Cycling Classic
 2nd Circuit du Trégor
 2nd Prestige Pernod
 2nd Roue d'Or à Daumesnil (with Jacques Anquetil)
 3rd Trophée Longines
 3rd Circuit de l'Aulne
 10th Tour de Romandie

1961
 Tour de France
 1st  Points classification
 1st stages 1a, 2, 13 & 20
 Held maillot jaune  during 1 stage
 1st stage 1 Critérium du Dauphiné
 1st stage 2 Paris–Nice
 1st Grand Prix du Parisien
 1st Critérium de Daumesnil
 1st Critérium de Narbonne
 1st Grand Prix de Magny-Cours
 1st Grand Prix de La Bastide d'Armagnac
 1st Grand Prix de Rousies
 1st Grand Prix de la Ronde du Parc à Montélimar
 1st Grand Prix de Nogaro
 1st Grand Prix de Plougasnou
 1st Grand Prix de la Ville de Figeac
 2nd Critérium International
 2nd Manx Trophy
 3rd Critérium des As
 3rd Circuit de l'Aulne
 8th Milan–San Remo

1962
 Tour de France
 1st stage 2a
 Held maillot jaune  during 4 stages
 1st stage 3 b Critérium du Dauphiné
 1st stages 6 & 8 Volta a la Comunitat Valenciana
 1st Grand Prix d'Aix
 1st Grand Prix de Caen
 1st Grand Prix de Beaumont en Périgord
 1st Grand Prix de Lalinde
 1st Grand Prix de Dax
 2nd Grand Prix de la Trinité
 3nd Circuit de l'Aulne
 5th Liège–Bastogne–Liège
 6th Trofeo Baracchi (with Joseph Velly)

1963
 Tour de France
 1st stage 12
 1st stage 6 Paris–Nice
 1st stage 3 Tour du Sud-Est
 1st stage 3 Tour du Var
 1st Grand Prix de Lalinde
 1st Grand Prix de Vichy
 1st Grand Prix de Miramont
 1st Grand Prix de la Ronde de Camors
 2nd Grand Prix du Parisien
 3rd Gênes-Nice
 3rd Six jours de Montréal (with Willi Altig)
 3rd Roue d'Or à Daumesnil (with Jean Stablinski)
 4th World Road Race Championships
 6th Critérium des As

1964
 Tour de France
 1st stages 2 & 18
 1st stages 8 b & 9 b Critérium du Dauphiné
 1st stage 5 Paris–Nice
 1st Genoa–Nice
 1st Grand Prix de La Bastide d'Armagnac
 1st Grand Prix de Château-Chinon
 1st Grand Prix de Guêret
 1st Grand Prix Lalinde
 1st Grand Prix de Caen
 1st stage 3 Circuit provençal
 6th UEC European Track Championships – Men's omnium

1965
 1st Grand Prix de Trélissac
 1st Grand Prix de Miramont
 4th Grand Prix du Parisien
 6th Six Days of Antwerp

1966
 1st Ronde de Monaco
 1st Grand Prix de Maurs
 1st Grand Prix de Brioude

Major championships timeline

Grand Tour general classification results timeline

Classics results timeline

See also

 List of French people
 UCI Road World Championships – Men's road race
 Grand Tour (cycling)
 Tour de France records and statistics
 Yellow jersey statistics
 List of Tour de France secondary classification winners
 List of Grand Tour points classification winners
 Combativity award in the Tour de France

References

External links

 Memoire du cyclisme
 CycleBase

1929 births
French male cyclists
French Tour de France stage winners
French Giro d'Italia stage winners
Living people
Sportspeople from Landes (department)
UCI Road World Champions (elite men)
Cyclists from Nouvelle-Aquitaine